St. Mary's Abbey Church is a historic Catholic parish church in the Archdiocese of Newark at 520 Martin Luther King Blvd (formerly High St.) and William St. in Newark, New Jersey.

History
The parish was established in 1842 to serve the needs of working-class German-speaking immigrants who worked in Newark's factories. It met originally in a wooden church, but this was destroyed in 1856 by anti-Catholic Know Nothing elements.

The new church was entrusted to the monks of the Order of Saint Benedict, first under the direction of Saint Vincent Archabbey in Latrobe, and then, after becoming an independent institution, by the monks of Newark Abbey, who continue to provide spiritual and academic guidance to the community through the parish and Saint Benedict's Preparatory School. 

Construction was completed in 1857. It was added to the National Register of Historic Places in 1972.

See also 
 National Register of Historic Places listings in Essex County, New Jersey

References

External links

 

Roman Catholic churches in New Jersey
Churches on the National Register of Historic Places in New Jersey
Roman Catholic churches completed in 1857
19th-century Roman Catholic church buildings in the United States
Roman Catholic churches in Newark, New Jersey
National Register of Historic Places in Newark, New Jersey
New Jersey Register of Historic Places
1842 establishments in New Jersey
Religious organizations established in 1842

African-American Roman Catholic churches